John Henry Ingram (November 16, 1842 – February 12, 1916) was an English biographer and editor with a special interest in Edgar Allan Poe.

Ingram was born at 29 City Road, Finsbury Square, Middlesex, and died at Brighton, England. His family lived at Stoke Newington, recollections of which appear in Poe's works.

J. H. Ingram dedicated himself to the resurrection of Poe's reputation, maligned by the dubious memoirs of Rufus Wilmot Griswold; he published the first reliable biography of the author and a four volume collection of his works.
Sarah Helen Whitman correspondence with Ingram, with her letters from Poe and a daguerrotype portrait, was added to the library of material he was assembling; Ingram's Poe collection is now held at the Albert and Shirley Small Special Collections Library at the University of Virginia.

Works
Flora Symbolica; or, the Language and Sentiment of Flowers
Christopher Marlowe and his associates
The haunted homes and family traditions of Great Britain
Jane Austen

References

External links

 
 
 
 
 

1842 births
1916 deaths
English editors
English biographers
English male non-fiction writers